Ohr Somayach may refer to:

Ohr Somayach (book), commentary by Rabbi Meir Simcha of Dvinsk
Ohr Somayach, common reference to Rabbi Meir Simcha of Dvinsk
Ohr Somayach, Jerusalem, a network of yeshivas based in Israel
Ohr Somayach, Monsey, a yeshiva in the United States
Ohr Somayach, South Africa, South African affiliate of Ohr Somayach, Jerusalem

See also
Ohr (disambiguation)